Ram Kumari Jhakri is a Nepalese politician and secretary of CPN (Unified Socialist). She is also the former Minister of Urban Development.

She currently serves as a member of House of Representatives. She supports reservation for women in the civil service. On August 21, she has announced that she will be candidate from VALU GAU . Announcing with a poster on social media, she said that she will break the legacy of UML and show it. Jhankri said she would be the candidate from Gulmi 2 from the 5 party alliance.

Controversial statements 
On 4 May 2019, she gave an interview to the talk show Janata Janna Chahanchhan (translation:People Want to Know) on Prime Times Television, in which she criticised her own party leader and prime minister KP Sharma Oli on the government's program for the fiscal year 2019-20. She said the prime minister's programs were an insult to republicanism. She had also been critical of finance minister Yubaraj Khatiwada in the past.

Political life

Early political career 
She is the first woman to be elected president of a major party affiliate student union. As the president of ANNFSU, she was one of the central figures protesting during the 2006 democracy movement in Nepal.

See also 

 CPN (Unified Socialist)

References

External links
 

Living people
Nepal MPs 2017–2022
Nepal Communist Party (NCP) politicians
21st-century Nepalese women politicians
21st-century Nepalese politicians
Communist Party of Nepal (Unified Socialist) politicians
People from Gulmi District
Government ministers of Nepal
Women government ministers of Nepal
Communist Party of Nepal (Unified Marxist–Leninist) politicians
1978 births